Dominic Dobson (born September 14, 1957) is a German-born former CART and Craftsman Truck Series driver who made 7 starts in the Indianapolis 500 with a best finish of 12th in 1992, over 60 starts in the CART (Championship Auto Racing Series), with a best finish of 3rd at the Michigan 500 in 1994. Dobson also drove numerous IMSA and other Sport car races, including the 24 Hours of Le Mans in 1989 in Porsche 962 alongside Jean Alesi and Will Hoy and at Daytona and Sebring, where his best finish was a 2nd place in 1990, co-driving with Sarel van der Merwe and Klaus Ludwig.

Dobson was raised in, and currently resides in, Seattle.

In the early 1980s, he was an instructor at the Bob Bondurant Driving School, then based at Sears Point Raceway in Sonoma.    In the mid-1980s, he started Zephyr Racing with Ron Nelson, another Bondurant instructor. Zephyr originally had its shops in San Rafael, CA but moved to a new facility built at Sears Point Raceway in the spring of 1985. Zephyr rented out, maintained, and provided race support for a stable of formula and sportsracing cars. Cars were rented on a race-by-race or season long basis. Zephyr's customers competed in SCCA regional and National events as well as the American City racing League.

In the late 1990s he was involved in a short lived North American Touring Car Championship's Dodge Stratus factory team that ran in conjunction with CART race weekends. He also made 10 starts in the Craftsman Truck Series for Dodge in 1998 with a best start of 3rd in Nazareth, PA and a best finish of 17th at Texas Motor Speedway.

From 2000 to 2003, he presided over a multimillion-dollar collection of historic automobiles, primarily European post-war racecars and rare road cars called the Cavallino Collection. From 2007 to 2015, he was the Chief Development Officer for the LeMay - America's Car Museum, in Tacoma, WA.

In 2005, Dobson competed in the Baja 100 with co-driver Frank Everett in a Baja Challenge car and in 2015, Dobson won the "Unlimited" Class at the Pikes Peak International Hillclimb and was awarded the coveted "Rookie of the Year" as a result. He continues to race occasionally in vintage car races in the US and abroad.

Dobson owns and operates Dobson Motorsport, LLC (www.dobsonmotorsport.com) a high-end Collector Car Brokerage and Management service and Gerber Motorsport (www.gerbernotorsport.com), a Porsche repair and restoration facility, both in Seattle. He also is co-founder and COO of VR Motion Corp in Hillsboro, OR, a company that builds products that power Virtual Reality experiences for the automotive market.

Racing record

American open–wheel racing results
(key)

PPG Indycar Series
(key) (Races in bold indicate pole position)

 1 Replaced by Phil Krueger
 2 Did not appear

Indianapolis 500

Complete 24 Hours of Le Mans results

NASCAR
(key) (Bold – Pole position awarded by qualifying time. Italics – Pole position earned by points standings or practice time. * – Most laps led.)

Craftsman Truck Series

References

External links
Dobson Motorsport
Gerber Motorsport
VR Motion Corp

1957 births
24 Hours of Le Mans drivers
SCCA Formula Super Vee drivers
Champ Car drivers
German racing drivers
Indianapolis 500 drivers
Living people
NASCAR drivers
Sportspeople from Stuttgart
Racing drivers from Baden-Württemberg
Racing drivers from Seattle
PacWest Racing drivers
Dale Coyne Racing drivers
North American Touring Car Championship drivers